John Shoolbred (30 November 1740–1802) was a Scottish slave trader primarily active in London. He was a member or "freeman" of the African Company of Merchants, an organisation established in Great Britain to participate in the transatlantic slave trade. He also served on the Committee of nine members who ran the company. When his reputation was under attack in 1777, he wrote to Edmund Burke to thank him for his political support.

Slave trading voyages

References

1740 births
1802 deaths
Scottish slave traders
African Company of Merchants